Matija Horvat (born 7 May 1999) is a Croatian professional footballer who plays as a midfielder for TSV Hartberg.

Club career
On 29 January 2021, he signed a 1.5-year contract with TSV Hartberg.

Career statistics

Club

Notes

References

External links
 Profile - ÖFB

1999 births
Living people
Association football midfielders
Croatian footballers
Kapfenberger SV players
TSV Hartberg players
2. Liga (Austria) players
Austrian Football Bundesliga players
Croatian expatriate footballers
Expatriate footballers in Austria
Croatian expatriate sportspeople in Austria
Sportspeople from Čakovec